George Partridge Colvocoresses (April 3, 1847 – September 10, 1932) was a United States Navy rear admiral. He was the son of Captain George M. Colvocoresses, the adopted son of Captain Alden Partridge, founder of Norwich University in Vermont. George P. was a graduate of the Norwich University class of 1866 and led a distinguished military career.

Life and career
He was born in Norwich, Vermont, on April 3, 1847, to Greek immigrant George M. Colvocoresses and Adeline Maria Swasey. He was named for his father's benefactor, Alden Partridge.

The younger Colvocoresses eventually rose to the rank of rear admiral and was Commandant of Cadets at the United States Naval Academy at Annapolis. He eventually served under then-Commodore George Dewey with the Asiatic Squadron at the battle of Manila Bay.

He entered the United States Naval Academy, then located in Newport, Rhode Island, in 1864, during the American Civil War, and graduated in 1869.

Colvocoresses served on most of the foreign naval stations, and in the Hydrographic Office at Washington, and in 1886 was assistant instructor in drawing at the United States Naval Academy, where he was an instructor in 1893–96 and commandant of midshipmen in 1905–1909.

In 1890, the officers and men of the United States Navy dedicated a granite-and-marble monument to the memory of Lieut. Lieutenant George P. Colvocoresses designed the monument—a cross with carved icicles hanging from it that sits atop a cairn. The -high structure is in the U.S. Naval Academy Cemetery overlooking the Severn River.

He distinguished himself in service as executive officer on the cruiser  at the Battle of Manila Bay, May 1, 1898, in the Spanish–American War, where the United States won a decisive victory over the Spanish Fleet, helping to end the Spanish naval threat and establish the United States as one of the world's military "super powers."

Commander Asa Walker, commander of the Concord, had the following to say: "Each and every one of my subordinates did his whole duty with an enthusiasm and zeal beyond all praise. I am particularly indebted to the executive officer, Lieut. Commander George P. Colvocoresses, for the cool, deliberate, and efficient manner with which he met each phase of the action, and for his hearty cooperation in my plans."

He participated in the capture of Manila on August 13, 1898, and shortly afterwards, became the executive officer of the cruiser .

In 1899, he became a Veteran Companion of the Pennsylvania Commandery of the Military Order of Foreign Wars.  He also became a Companion of the California Commandery of Military Order of the Loyal Legion of the United States.

He was promoted to captain in February 1905, and was retired in the rank of rear admiral on June 30, 1907.

In 1919, Rear Admiral Colvocoresses, whose name appears on the Centennial Staircase at Norwich, delivered an address about Captain Alden Partridge on the 100th anniversary of the founding of Norwich University.

Colvocoresses, married Minnie D. Van Nest she was the daughter of Theodore Eli Van Nest. They had one daughter and two sons: Edith B., Major Harold Colvocoresses U.S.M.C., and George M. (II) Colvocoresses. The son of George M. (II) Colvocoresses, Col. Alden Partridge Colvocoresses, USA (Ret.), went on to develop the first satellite map of the United States.

Awards
 Dewey Medal
 Civil War Campaign Medal
 Spanish Campaign Medal
 Philippine Campaign Medal

Dates of rank
 Midshipman – 28 September 1864
 Graduated – 4 June 1869
 Ensign – 12 July 1870
 Master – 18 June 1872
 Lieutenant – 1 July 1875 
 Lieutenant commander – 4 June 1897
 Commander – 30 June 1900
 Captain – 21 February 1905
 Rear admiral on Retired List – 30 June 1907

Served two years and two months as Captain's Clerk during the Civil War.

References

External links
 

 

1847 births
1932 deaths
American people of Greek descent
Norwich University alumni
United States Naval Academy alumni
United States Naval Academy faculty
United States Navy rear admirals
People from Norwich, Vermont
People of Vermont in the American Civil War
Artists from Vermont
19th-century Greek Americans